Mario Tassone (born 8 August 1943 in Castrovillari, Calabria) is an Italian politician and lawyer.

Biography
Tassone was member of the Chamber of Deputies from 1976 to 1994 and from 1996 to 2013. He served as Undersecretary to the Ministry of Public Works in the First and Second Craxi government and in the Sixth Fanfani government. He also served as Deputy Minister of Infrastructure and Transport in the Second and Third Berlusconi government.

He was member of the Christian Democracy until its dissolution, subsequently he joined the PPI, the CDU and the Union of Christian and Centre Democrats.

On 11 May 2013, Tassone, in disagreement with the strategies of the Union of the Centre for the alliance with Civic Choice, called the national council of the CDU. After being referred to the arbitrators by the party's Calabrian regional committee, he left the UDC and founded the New CDU.

References

1943 births
Living people
Christian Democracy (Italy) politicians
Italian People's Party (1994) politicians
United Christian Democrats politicians
Democratic Union for the Republic politicians
Union of the Centre (2002) politicians
Deputies of Legislature VII of Italy
Deputies of Legislature VIII of Italy
Deputies of Legislature IX of Italy
Deputies of Legislature X of Italy
Deputies of Legislature XI of Italy
Deputies of Legislature XIII of Italy
Deputies of Legislature XIV of Italy
Deputies of Legislature XV of Italy
Deputies of Legislature XVI of Italy
Politicians of Calabria